The Africa/Harvard School of Public Health Partnership for Cohort Research and Training (Africa/HSPH PaCT) launched in 2008, is a collaborative research project led by Principal Investigators, Dr. Hans-Olov Adami and Dr. Michelle D. Holmes. Together with research scientists, Dr. Shona Dalal and Dr. Todd G. Reid, this team represents the Harvard Coordinating Site of the Partnership with colleagues from five institutions in Nigeria, South Africa, Tanzania, and Uganda. The Africa/HSPH PaCT project plans on investigating the association of lifestyle factors and chronic disease risk in sub- Saharan Africa, through a large epidemiological cohort study that will include approximately 500,000 participants. Africa/HSPH PaCT is the first and largest cohort study conducted in sub-saharan Africa to employ mobile phone technology to follow participants and collect data. Africa/HSPH PaCT will also provide the infrastructure for capacity-building and for training a new generation of health professionals.

Addressing the Chronic Disease Tsunami
In New York City of the 1980s, patients began presenting to doctors with mysterious symptoms. Dr. Michelle D. Holmes, Co-Principal Investigator of Africa/HSPH PaCT, was among those witnessing the explosion of the AIDS pandemic. Today, a new pandemic of heart disease, mental illness, cancer, and diabetes threatens Africa 
. We can learn from the '80's and prevent this looming disease tsunami. Cohort studies ask thousands about their diet, exercise, smoking, and other habits, to guide prevention policies. Africa is the last place on earth to have such studies; Africa/HSPH PaCT stands ready to fill the gap.

Research Sites
The Principal Investigators and host institutions for the African sites are: Dr. Jimmy Volmink who is the Dean of the Faculty of Health Sciences at Stellenbosch University in South Africa; Dr. Clement Adebamowo at the Institute of Human Virology in Nigeria; Dr. David Guwattude at Makerere University in Kampala and Dr. Francis Bajunirwe at Mbarara University in Mbarara, Uganda; and Dr. Marina Njelekela at Muhimbili University, in Tanzania. Cohorts in South Africa and Tanzania will consist of school teachers, and health professionals will be recruited in Nigeria. Complementing these groups will be participants from peri-urban and rural locations in Uganda, in order to capture a wide variety of lifestyles and populations.

Study Aims
Africa/HSPH PaCT will investigate chronic non-communicable diseases (NCDs), namely cardiovascular disease, diabetes mellitus (DM), mental illness, breast and cervical cancers, which are on the rise in African countries. This research will provide a sound scientific basis for prevention of NCDs in Africa

Africa/HSPH PaCT will seek to:
- Better quantify the magnitude of NCDs
- Discover risk factors for NCDs in Africa and how they interact with the African genome
- Train a new generation of public health researchers and practitioners
- Pave the way for innovative methods of data collection employing the latest technology and techniques in computational social science
- Spur a wave of social entrepreneurism geared toward chronic disease management and public health prevention

Pilot studies and Data Collection
Pilot studies, that capture the demographics, lifestyle factors, and chronic disease incidence have been started in all five African sites. This preliminary information collected from the pilot phase will guide and inform the next and larger phase of the initiative. A total of approximately 1500 participants have been enrolled in all five sites and followed for 6 months. In the Tanzania and South Africa sites, data was collected through a questionnaire. Face-to-face interviews were conducted in Kampala, Mbarara, and Nigeria. Blood samples were also collected in Mbarara and South Africa. A food-frequency questionnaire and follow-up questionnaires to measure incident NCDs were used to collect information in all five sites. Data from the pilot is currently being analyzed for publication

Plan for Enrollment and Scale-up
At enrollment time, a uniform food frequency questionnaire that accommodates the wide range of dietary patterns across sub-Saharan Africa will be administered. Prof. Walter Willett, Chair of the Nutrition Department at HSPH and Principal Investigator of the Nurses' Health Study, played a crucial role in developing this questionnaire. The baseline measurement covers a large range of lifestyle factors including, but not limited to, measures of stress, socioeconomic circumstances, education, reproductive factors (among women), physical activity, smoking and alcohol use, healthcare utilization, and anthropometric measures. Approximately 500,000 study participants from the five African sites will be enrolled over a five-year period and the timeline as follows:

Year 1 : Hiring and training of personnel, development of questionnaire (including translation to and back-translation from the relevant languages), establishment of IT infrastructure, preparation of the biobank with blood samples, and definition of source populationYears 2 & 3 : Enrollment of 20,000 cohort participants per site, for a total of 100,000Year 4 & 5 :  Follow-up, ascertainment and validation of outcomes, optimization of procedures for retention and compliance, and analyses of cross-sectional data. Cleaning databases, analyzing data, and preparing manuscripts based on the follow-up data

Mobile Phones
A major part of Africa/HSPH PaCT's innovation is research on cell phone use in scientific studies in Africa. Mobile phones offer entirely new opportunities for cost-effective, large-scale longitudinal studies. Africa/HSPH PaCT is the first study to rely strongly on mobile phones for enrollment, retention, and follow-up and will work in close collaboration with the Human Dynamics Group of the Pentland Lab (MediaLab, Massachusetts Institute of Technology) who are leaders in the field of mobile phone data analytics and computational social science.

Plans for Expansion
The Africa/HSPH PaCT group is currently exploring collaborations with other research groups that are also in the beginning stages of creating large-scale cohort studies.  In October 2010, the first-ever World Cohort Integration Workshop, hosted by Dr. Hans-Olov Adami was held in Hydra, Greece. This gathering brought together researchers from Mexico (EsMaestra, Mexican Teachers’ Cohort), India (Barshi Cohort), Sweden (LifeGene Sweden), Iceland (University of Iceland), and the United States and four countries in Africa (Africa/HSPH PaCT). The main purpose of this workshop was to share best practices as well as lessons learned and also to pave the way for sharing data, resources, and ideas in the long-term among cohort studies. Combined data from these groups will represent over two million study participants. Africa/HSPH PaCT is also exploring how best to pair up this large and unique cohort study with partners to create a cadre of social entrepreneurs to help spawn public health innovations in sub- Saharan Africa. Africa/HSPH PaCT currently supports one such social entrepreneurial venture, the ImpacTree project, that is an innovative public social platform for individuals to make their own impact on important issues in the developing world

References

External links
 Michelle D. Holmes, MD, DrPH, MPH
 Hans-Olov Adami, MD, PhD
 Africa/HSPH PaCT
 Impactree.com
 Harvard School of Public Health
 World Health Organization|UN Conference on Non-Communicable Diseases
 Harvard University
 HSPH Nutrition Department
 MIT Human Dynamics Lab
 World Cohort Integration Workshop
 LifeGene

Public health research